The Progress in Development Studies  is a blind peer reviewed academic journal that aims to serve as a forum for the discussion of development issues, including:

Poverty alleviation and international aid 
The international debt crisis 
Economic development and industrialization 
Environmental degradation and sustainable development 
Political governance and civil society 
Gender relations 
The rights of the child

The journal is published four times a year by SAGE Publications, India with a view that development should be defined as change, whether positive or negative.
This journal is a member of the Committee on Publication Ethics (COPE).

Abstracting and indexing 
Progress in Development Studies is abstracted and indexed in:
 Thomson Reuters Citation Index
 ProQuest: International Bibliography of the Social Sciences (IBSS)
 Social Sciences Citation Index (Web of Science)
 SCOPUS
 Research Papers in Economics (RePEc)
 DeepDyve
 Portico
 Dutch-KB
 Pro-Quest-RSP
 EBSCO
 OCLC
 Ohio
 ICI
 ProQuest-Illustrata
 Australian Business Deans Council
 ProQuest: Bioscience Library
 J-Gate

References 

 http://publicationethics.org/members/progress-development-studies

External links 
 
 Homepage

SAGE Publishing academic journals
Publications established in 2007
Development studies journals